Nicol Keith Anderson  (10 June 1882 – 1 September 1953)   was an Anglican priest: he was the Archdeacon of Kingston-upon-Thames from 1946 until 1953.
Richardson was educated at Marlborough and Oriel College, Oxford  and ordained in 1908. Following a curacy at St Pancras Parish Church he was: Chaplain at the Indian Ecclesiastical Establishment, Rangoon, (1911–34); Archdeacon of Rangoon, (1930 – 1934); Secretary, South London Church Fund and Southwark Diocesan Board of Finance (1935–1952); and a Canon Residentiary at Southwark Cathedral, (1937–50).

References

1882 births
People educated at Marlborough College
Alumni of Oriel College, Oxford
Archdeacons of Kingston upon Thames
1953 deaths